The U Sports Goaltender of the Year is the annual award presented to the U Sports men's ice hockey player who is judged by a committee of the U Sports Men’s Hockey Coaches Association to be the most outstanding goaltender in U Sports.

Winners
2016-17: Jordon Cooke (University of Saskatchewan)
2015-16: Jordon Cooke (University of Saskatchewan)
2014-15: Anthony Peters (Saint Mary's University)
2013-14: Jacob DeSerres (University of Calgary)
2012-13: Kurtis Mucha (University of Alberta)
2011-12: Real Cyr (University of Alberta)
2010-11: Dustin Butler (University of Calgary)
2009-10: Steve Christie (University of Manitoba)

References

U Sports ice hockey trophies and awards